Sundaralinga Kudumbanar (died 1799), also known as "Veeran" Sundaralingam Kudumbanar, was an 18th-century CE general from Tamil Nadu, India.

Fight against British
He was a general of the Poligar Veerapandiya Kattabomman in their fight against the British East India Company.
.According to a majority of the accepted historical accounts, he was killed in 1799, while fighting for Kattabomman during the First Polygar War. Another view is that he was killed in the Second Polygar War (1800-1) while assisting Kattabomman's younger brother Oomaithurai.

Legacy
In 2009, the Tamil Nadu government-issued a policy note to build a memorial for Sundaralingam at Governagiri. He belonged to the Devendrakula Velalar, an agricultural community found in the Indian state of Tamil Nadu.

See also
Maruthu Pandiyar
Periya Kaladi

References

Indian independence activists from Tamil Nadu
1799 deaths
Indian Tamil people
Tamil history
Indian independence movement
18th century in India
Year of birth unknown
Polygar Wars